The 1980 United States presidential election in Hawaii took place on November 4, 1980. All 50 states and The District of Columbia, were part of the 1980 United States presidential election. Hawaii voters chose four electors to the Electoral College, who voted for president and vice president.

Hawaii was won by President Jimmy Carter (D) by 1.9 points. Hawaii is a very liberal state, and both of the state's U.S. senators have been Democrats since 1977, which is partly the reason Reagan lost, albeit very narrowly. As of 2020, this is the second of two times (the first being 1960) in which not all of Hawaii's counties voted for the same candidate. This was the second of three times in which Oahu supported a Republican on the presidential level.

Results

Results by county

References

Hawaii
1980
1980 Hawaii elections